The Rudolfův kámen (also called Ostroh;  or Hoher Stein) is a rocky hill in the Elbe Sandstone Mountains in the Czech Republic, in the territory of Jetřichovice.

Rudolfův kámen is part of the Jetřichovice Rocks and belong to the most visited viewing points in the area. It was named in 1824 after Rudolf, 6th Prince Kinsky of Wchinitz and Tettau. A hut was built at the top.

References

Mountains and hills of the Czech Republic
Mountains and hills of Bohemian Switzerland
Rock formations of the Czech Republic
Děčín District